Igillenna Ai Dagalanne is a 2013 Sri Lankan Sinhala action film directed by Arjuna Kamalanath and co-produced by Isuru Films and Arosha Fernando. It stars Arjuna Kamalanath and Ameesha Kavindi in lead roles. Music composed by Keshan Perera. It is the 1194th Sri Lankan film in the Sinhala cinema.

Cast
 Arjuna Kamalanath as Wickrama
 Ameesha Kavindi as Jina
 Sudath Wijesekara as Jerry
 Chami Senanayake as Rosairo
 Sapna Kareem as Rosy
 Rashmi Pushpika as Marie
 Marian Elizabeth as Jane
 Nimesha Sewwandi as Taniya
 Channa Chanaka as Chillie

References

2013 films
2010s Sinhala-language films